The Free Religious Association (FRA) was an American freethought organization that opposed organized religion and aimed to form in its place a universal rational religion free of dogma or theology, based on evolutionary science.

History

The Free Religious Association was formed in 1867 in part by David Atwood Wasson, Lucretia Mott, and Reverend William J. Potter. to be, in Potter's words, a "spiritual anti-slavery society" to "emancipate religion from the dogmatic traditions it had been previously bound to". It was opposed not only to organized religion, but also to any supernaturalism in an attempt to affirm the supremacy of individual conscience and individual reason. The FRA carried a message of the perfectibility of humanity, democratic faith in the worth of each individual, the importance of natural rights and the affirmation of the efficacy of reason.

The first public assembly was held in 1867 representing something akin to a town meeting with an audience ranging from Progressive Quakers, liberal Jews, radical Unitarians, Universalists, agnostics, Spiritualists, and scientific theists to promote religious freedom. Robert Dale Owen was present at the first meeting. The first person to join the association at the original meeting was the famed American individualist Ralph Waldo Emerson. It caught on and many FRA members helped to lead communes based on their values on equality and self organizing organizations. Thomas Wentworth Higginson, Charles Eliot Norton and Francis Ellingwood Abbot were members. In 1892, its Vice Presidents included the abolitionist Frederick Douglass and the humanists Felix Adler and Moncure Conway.

The association existed until 1914. Its 47th annual meeting proceedings were published with the title World Religion and World Brotherhood.

The Index

The Free Religious Association became formally associated with The Index: A Weekly Paper Devoted to Free Religion, which became its semi-official periodical. It was edited by Francis Ellingwood Abbot until 1873 and then by his assistant A . W . Stevens. Charles Darwin subscribed to The Index and until his death sent Abbot donations (as much as £25 one year).  Abbott was the owner of The Index until 1880. After this, it became the property of the Free Religious Association. In 1881, it changed name to the Free Religious Index, but was restored to its original name after eleven months.  W.J. Potter became the official editor and his assistant Benjamin F. Underwood did much of the editorial work. The December 30, 1886 issue was the final edition of The Index. 

In February 1887, The Open Court journal became the official publication of the Free Religious Association. By the end of 1887, Underwood resigned and Paul Carus became editor and Edward C. Hegeler's Open Court Publishing Company published The Open Court journal until 1936.

Free Association of Religious Teachers

An organization calling itself Free Association of Religious Teachers was formed in 2010 which claims spiritual descent from the FRA. It is currently active in offering free teaching and certification in various aspects of interspiritual ministry and transodox theology.

References

External links

The Index: A Weekly Paper Devoted to Free Religion - HathiTrust

Freethought organizations
Nontheism
Religion in the United States